Hamzali is a village  in the municipality of Bosilovo, North Macedonia.

Demographics
As of the 2021 census, Hamzali had 20 residents with the following ethnic composition:
Macedonians 10
Turks 7
Persons for whom data are taken from administrative sources 3

According to the 2002 census, the village had a total of 22 inhabitants. Ethnic groups in the village include:
Macedonians 12
Turks 8
Serbs 2

References

See also
 Bosilovo Municipality
 Bosilovo
 Strumica

Villages in Bosilovo Municipality